Sanad ibn Rumaythah ibn ibn Muḥammad Abī Numayy al-Ḥasanī was Emir of Mecca in partnership with his cousin Muhammad ibn Utayfah from 1359 to 1360.

Notes

References

 
Banu Qatadah
14th-century Arabs